Atefeh Riazi is an American technologist and public administrator. She is the Memorial Sloan Kettering Cancer Center Chief Information Officer since February 3, 2020, where she is to develop and implement an enterprise-wide, long-term strategic information technology (IT) plan and oversee the integration of data and technology resources across the organization.

Prior to that, she was the United Nations' Chief Information Technology Officer, Assistant Secretary-General, Office of Information and Communications Technology, with responsibility for all of the organization's needs relating to information and communications technology.  She was appointed as head of the Office of Information and Communications Technology by United Nations Secretary-General Ban Ki-moon on 9 May 2013.

Biography
After graduating from Stony Brook University with an Electrical Engineering degree, Riazi rose through IT ranks, holding various positions in the public and private sectors. Prior to her appointment at the United Nations, Riazi served as Chief Information Officer and Acting General Manager at the New York City Housing Authority.

References

American officials of the United Nations
Living people
American chief technology officers
Stony Brook University alumni
Year of birth missing (living people)
Memorial Sloan Kettering Cancer Center